I Live with Models is a British television sitcom created by Jon Foster and James Lamont, which originally aired on Comedy Central UK from 23 February 2015. In March 2016 Comedy Central announced that they had ordered a second series, consisting of eight more episodes to be filmed and broadcast later that year.

Overview
When regular guy Tommy is discovered as a hand model, he finds himself "living the dream" with three young models first in a Miami, and then in a New York City apartment.

Cast

Main 
 David Hoffman as Tommy Bishop
 Brianne Howey as Scarlet Wayde
 Rebecca Reid as Anna (series 1)
 Eric Aragon as Enrique (series 1)  
 Joseph May as Luke (series 1)
 Lydia Rose Bewley as Jess (series 2)
 Kamilla Alnes as Molly (series 2)
 Karan Soni as Marshall (series 2)

Supporting 
 Theo Cross as Gabe (pilot episode only)
 Alex Beckett as Seth, Tommy's friend
 Dave Fulton as Vinny (series 1) 
 Don McGilvray as Gummy Joe (series 1)

Episodes

Series overview

Series 1 (2015)

Series 2 (2017)

References

External links
 

Comedy Central original programming
2015 British television series debuts
2010s British sitcoms
Modeling-themed television series
English-language television shows